The 1998 Rice Owls football team represented Rice University in the 1998 NCAA Division I-A college football season. The Owls, led by fifth-year head coach Ken Hatfield, played their home games at Rice Stadium in Houston, Texas. The Owls finished the season 5–6, 5–3 in WAC play to finish in fourth place in the Mountain Division.

Schedule

References

Rice
Rice Owls football seasons
Rice Owls football